Platon Atanacković (Sombor, Vojvodina, Habsburg monarchy, 10 July 1788 – Novi Sad, Habsburg Monarchy, 21 April 1867) was a writer, linguist, patron of Serb culture, bishop of the Eparchy of Bačka and president of Matica srpska.

Born in the then Austro-Hungarian-occupied Vojvodina, he became the bishop of Bačka and promoted education among his people in the diaspora and the home country. With help of the German translation of Frédéric Eichhoff's works, he demonstrated the cognition of Sanskrit and Serbian (Srodstvo slavenoserbskog jezika sa sanskritam or Affinity of Slavo-Serbian languages and Sanskrit, Letopis Matice srpske, 1843).

Platon's secular name was Pavle. He was involved in literature, politics and humanitarian work. He taught for 70 years as a professor in Szentendre, Hungary. In 1829, he became a monk in Krušedol Monastery, after his wife died. Soon, he was elevated to the ecclesiastical rank of abbot, and then Archimandrite. He became in 1839 bishop of the Eparchy of Buda. Back then, he got transferred to the state government in the Eparchy of Bačka.

He did much for education and the promotion of culture in the nation. He helped financially to establish the Serbian Law Academy in Novi Sad, and he established a foundation in Sombor for the education of poor students, and assisted the Serbian National Theatre.

Works
During his lifetime he wrote more than 40 literary and scholastic works, including a few translations from German:

 Bukvar (Serbian Primer)
 Prinos rodoljubivih mislej na žertvenik narodnoga napretka,
 Dijetalne besede, 
 Povjest rezidencije episkopa budimskago”, 
 Apostoli i Evanđelje u prazničani i nedjeljni dana preko cijele godine,
 Pedagogika, 
 Metodika,
 Srodstvo slavenoserbskog jezika sa sanskritam Starozavetni Proroci svi sedamnajst, translated from German by Platon Atanackovic, Bishop of Backa, Novi Sad, 1861
 Radost' u isceleiu negovoga kralevskoga erchercoga Iosifa, ungarie palatine, 1864
 Tobias, Judith, Esther, Job, translated from German by Platon Atanackovic, Bishop of Buda, Novi Sad, 1858
 Socinenija Solomonova i Sirachova, translated from German Die Werke Solomons und Sirachs by Platon Atanackovic, Bishop of Backa, Vienna, 1857
 Slovce Presvjascennejseg Gospodina Platona Atanackovica, Episkop Budimskog,'' Novi Sad, 1839

References 

1788 births
1867 deaths
Writers from Sombor
19th-century Serbian writers
19th-century male writers
Writers from Novi Sad
Linguists from Serbia
19th-century Eastern Orthodox bishops
Bishops of Bačka
Serbian Orthodox Church in Hungary
19th-century linguists